The 1996–97 Slovenian PrvaLiga season started on 4 August 1996 and ended on 1 June 1997. Each team played a total of 36 matches.

League table

Relegation play-offs

Beltinci won 1–0 on aggregate.

Results
Every team plays four times against their opponents, twice at home and twice on the road, for a total of 36 matches.

First half of the season

Second half of the season

Top goalscorers

See also
1996 Slovenian Supercup
1996–97 Slovenian Football Cup
1996–97 Slovenian Second League

References
General

External links
Official website of the PrvaLiga 

Slovenian PrvaLiga seasons
Slovenia
1996–97 in Slovenian football